Gary T. Klutt (born August 14, 1992) is a Canadian professional stock car racing driver and a member of the 2016 NASCAR Next class. He is also the Host of the Gary Klutt Podcast. He currently competes Full- Time in the NASCAR Pinty's Series, driving the No. 59 Dodge Challenger for Legendary Motorcar Company. He also co-hosts the Canadian reality television show Legendary Motorcar with his father Peter. He has also raced in the NASCAR Gander Outdoors Truck Series.

Racing career

Pinty's Series

Early years
Klutt began his racing career in 2000, finding success quickly, winning karting championships in 2003, 2004, 2005, and 2007 and the Canadian Nationals in 2009.

Debuting in 2010 at Canadian Tire Motorsport Park, Klutt qualified 16th and finished 11th in his family No. 68 entry. He did not return to the series until 2013, running another race at CTMP, starting seventh and finishing seventh in a family-entered No. 59 car. The team entered four races in 2014, running top tens at Circuit ICAR and CTMP, and falling out of one race with mechanical issues.

Full-time
Klutt started racing full-time in 2015, starting from the pole and winning the season-opening race at CTMP in only his seventh series start. He garnered one other pole and six other top tens en route to a 5th-place points finish. He also garnered Rookie of the Year honors. 2016 brought a bit less success, as Klutt raced his way to eight top tens but not one top five finish and failed to finish two races. Also during the 2016 season, Klutt was named to the 2016 NASCAR Next class. He returned to full time racing for the 2022 season, finishing 9th in the point standings with four top fives and eight top tens.

Post full-time
After the 2016 season, Klutt picked up other obligations and started running part-time again, focusing on crown jewel road course races. He continued with his family Legendary Motorcar team, sometimes driving the hauler to the track.

Gander Outdoors Truck Series
During his 2016 Pinty's season, Klutt signed on with Kyle Busch Motorsports to run a NASCAR Camping World Truck Series race at Canadian Tire Motorsport Park, the track at which he had experienced the most success in the Pinty's series. Klutt was a sub for Cody Coughlin, who could not drive the race. Klutt said he wanted a chance to race trucks at CTMP ever since 2013. During the race, Klutt improved four spots on his qualifying position to finish 11th.

Monster Energy Cup Series
On August 6, 2017, Klutt made his Monster Energy NASCAR Cup Series debut at Watkins Glen International, where he drove the No. 15 Chevrolet for Premium Motorsports. He qualified 34th and finished 31st, one lap behind race winner Martin Truex Jr.

Personal life
Klutt works for his family reality television show Legendary Motorcar, which is shown internationally (U. S. on Velocity and in other countries, Discovery World). His other interests include real estate.

Motorsports career results

NASCAR
(key) (Bold – Pole position awarded by qualifying time. Italics – Pole position earned by points standings or practice time. * – Most laps led.)

Monster Energy Cup Series

Gander Outdoors Truck Series

Pinty's Series

K&N Pro Series East

 Season still in progress
 Ineligible for series points

References

External links
 

Living people
1992 births
People from Halton Hills
Racing drivers from Ontario
NASCAR drivers